General elections were held in Sweden on 15 September 1991.

National results

Regional results

Percentage share

By votes

Constituency results

Percentage share

By votes

Municipal summary

Municipal results

Blekinge

Dalarna

Kopparberg County

Gotland

Gävleborg

Halland

Jämtland

Jönköping

Kalmar

Kronoberg

Norrbotten

Skåne
Skåne was divided into two separate counties at the time. Malmöhus was divided into Fyrstadskretsen (Four-city constituency) based around the Öresund urban areas and one covering the more rural parts of the county. Kristianstad County was one constituency for the whole county.

Kristianstad

Malmö area
Four-city constituency

Malmöhus

Stockholm

Stockholm (city)

Stockholm County

Södermanland

Uppsala

Värmland

Västerbotten

Västernorrland

Västmanland

Västra Götaland
Västra Götaland did have three different counties at the time. Those were Göteborg och Bohuslän, Skaraborg and Älvsborg. There were five constituencies, namely two for Göteborg och Bohuslän, one for Skaraborg and two for Älvsborg.

Bohuslän

Gothenburg

Skaraborg

Älvsborg N

Älvsborg S

Örebro

Östergötland
Although both blocs got rounded to 44.7%, the leftist bloc won Valdemarsvik by 2,565 to 2,563 votes.

References

General elections in Sweden